Cerithidium cerithinum is a species of sea snail, a marine gastropod mollusk in the family Cerithiidae.

Description

Distribution
This species is distributed in the Red Sea and in the Indian Ocean along Madagascar.

References

 Dautzenberg, Ph. (1929). Mollusques testaces marins de Madagascar. Faune des Colonies Francaises, Tome III

Cerithiidae
Gastropods described in 1849